Pistol New Zealand (PNZ) is the umbrella sporting federation of handgun shooting sports and clubs in New Zealand. Pistol New Zealand was formerly known as the New Zealand Pistol Association (NZPA). PNZ is affiliated with the following shooting sports:

 Metallic silhouette under International Metallic Silhouette Shooting Union
 Practical shooting under International Practical Shooting Confederation
 ISSF shooting events under International Shooting Sport Federation
 Cowboy action shooting
 Muzzle Loading under Muzzle Loaders Associations International Committee
 Action shooting under Precision Pistol Competition

The federation comprises over 80 clubs nationally.

References

External links
 Official Pistol New Zealand website

Regions of the International Practical Shooting Confederation
Shooting sports in New Zealand
Sports governing bodies in New Zealand